The 1999 ANZ Tasmanian International singles was the singles event of the sixth edition of the ANZ Tasmanian International. Patty Schnyder was the defending champion but did not compete that year.

Chanda Rubin won in the final 6–2, 6–3 against Rita Grande.

Seeds

Draw

Finals

Top half

Bottom half

Qualifying

Seeds

Qualifiers

Lucky losers
  Kristina Brandi

Qualifying draw

First qualifier

Second qualifier

Third qualifier

Fourth qualifier

External links
 1999 ANZ Tasmanian International Draw

Hobart International – Singles
Singles